Kevin Kalish is an American soccer coach and former player who, as of 2018, was serving as head coach of the Saint Louis Billikens men's soccer team.  He played professionally in the National Professional Soccer League.

Youth
In 1995, Kalish graduated from St. Thomas Aquinas-Mercy High School.  During his four-year prep soccer career, Kalish was three-time All State as Aquinas-Mercy won the 1992 and 1993 State Champions.  His senior season, he was the MVP of the Midwest Championship and a Parade Magazine High School All American.  In 1995, Kalish entered the University of Connecticut where he was a two-year starter on the men's soccer team.  He played defender as well as attacking and holding midfield.  Following his senior season, he transferred to St. Louis University.  He finished his collegiate career with two season as a Billiken.  He was a 1998 First Team All American.  He graduated in 1999 with a bachelor's degree in marketing.  In 2007, St. Louis University inducted Kalish into its Athletic Hall of Fame.  During his collegiate career, Kalish continued to play club soccer with Scott Gallagher, winning the 1998 U-23 National Championship with them.

Professional
In 1998, the St. Louis Ambush of the National Professional Soccer League drafted Kalish.  He did not sign with them.  On February 8, 1999, the Kansas City Wizards selected Kalish in the third round (26th overall) of the 1999 MLS College Draft.  The Nashville Metros also drafted Kalish.  On November 16, 1999, Kalish signed with the Ambush. When the Ambush folded at the end of the season, Kalish moved to the Buffalo Blizzard.  On January 26, 2001, the Blizzard traded Kalish to the Kansas City Attack for Chris Handsor.

Coach
In 1999, Kalish served as an assistant coach with the Saint Louis Billikens.  In 2000, he moved to Southern Illinois University Edwardsville as an assistant.  In 2008, he became the Cougars' head coach.

On December 6, 2013, he resigned to assume a position with the St. Louis Scott Gallagher Soccer Club that would allow him to spend more time with his family.

On January 20, 2018, he was named head coach of his alma mater, St. Louis University,

Record by Year

References

External links
 College player profile
 Saint Louis Billikens bio

1977 births
Living people
People from Florissant, Missouri
American soccer coaches
American soccer players
Buffalo Blizzard players
UConn Huskies men's soccer players
Kansas City Attack players
National Professional Soccer League (1984–2001) players
SIU Edwardsville Cougars men's soccer coaches
Saint Louis Billikens men's soccer coaches
Saint Louis Billikens men's soccer players
St. Louis Ambush (1992–2000) players
Sporting Kansas City draft picks
Soccer players from Missouri
All-American men's college soccer players
Association football defenders